Aphnaeus williamsi, the Williams' highflier, is a butterfly in the family Lycaenidae. It is found along the coast of Kenya. The habitat consists of savanna on the edges of coastal forests.

Adults have been recorded feeding from flowers.

References

Butterflies described in 1964
Aphnaeus
Lepidoptera of Kenya
Butterflies of Africa